Wrangelia is a genus of red algae in the family Wrangeliaceae.

The genus was circumscribed by Carl Adolf Agardh in his book Species algarum rite cognitae, cum synonymis, differentiis specificis et descriptionibus succinctis. Voluminis secundi. Sectio prior. pp. [i]-lxxvi, [i]-189. in 1828.

The genus name of Wrangelia is in honour of Fredrik Anton von Wrangel (1786–1842), who was a Danish-Swedish Chamberlain, and also a botanist and alga specialist. 

The type species, Wrangelia penicillata is also commonly called Pink bush alga. They have small branches which travel outwards alternately from either side of the main branches in a single plane. They are light pink purple in colour. The species grows in shallow waters to moderate depths, while attached to nearly any hard substrate
Generally, the species has 5 whorl branchlets per segment and a cortex that partially or wholly covers their axes.

Distribution
The genus has almost cosmopolitan distribution. Such as Wrangelia penicillata can be found off the coast of Florida, the Bahamas and the Caribbean. As well as near Mauritius. It has also been found in the Mediterranean (off the coasts of Spain, France, Corsica, Italy, Sicily, Greece, Turkey, Israel and Libya) as well as in the Adriatic Sea.
While Wrangelia gordoniae is found in the tropical western Atlantic Ocean. 5 species of Wrangelia are found near Australia. Species of Wrangelia are also found near Puerto Rico, and Brazil.

They can often be found growing on limestone (rock or soils) or be epiphytic on seagrass and seaweeds.

Species 
As accepted by WoRMS;

 Wrangelia abietina 
 Wrangelia anastomosans 
 Wrangelia argus 
 Wrangelia australis 
 Wrangelia balakrishnanii 
 Wrangelia bicuspidata 
 Wrangelia confluens 
 Wrangelia dumontii 
 Wrangelia elegantissima 
 Wrangelia galeae 
 Wrangelia globifera 
 Wrangelia gordoniae 
 Wrangelia hainanensis 
 Wrangelia incurva 
 Wrangelia nigrescens 
 Wrangelia nobilis 
 Wrangelia penicillata 
 Wrangelia penicillta 
 Wrangelia plebeja 
 Wrangelia plumosa 
 Wrangelia purpurifera 
 Wrangelia sceptrifera 
 Wrangelia sporigera 
 Wrangelia sundaralingamii 
 Wrangelia tagoi 
 Wrangelia tanegana 
 Wrangelia tenuis 
 Wrangelia variabilis 
 Wrangelia velutina 
 Wrangelia verticillata

References

Other sources
 Dawes, C.J. and A.C. Mathieson (2008). Seaweeds of Florida. University Press of Florida (592 pp).
 Gray, Samuel Octavius, British Sea-Weeds: An Introduction to the Study of the Marine Algae of Great Britain, Ireland, and the Channel Islands, 1867
 Schneider, C. W. (2003). An annotated checklist and bibliography of the marine macroalgae of the Bermuda Islands. Nova Hedwigia, 76(3-4): 275-361
 Silva, P. C.; Basson, P. W.; Moe, R. L. (1996). Catalogue of the benthic marine algae of the Indian Ocean. University of California Publications in Botany. 79: 1-1259

External links
Wrangelia images and occurrence data from GBIF

 
 
 Wrangelia at AlgaeBase

Red algae genera
Ceramiales